Gerard of Bologna (died 1317) was an Italian Carmelite theologian and scholastic philosopher.

A convinced Thomist, he took a doctorate in theology in 1295 at the University of Paris. Subsequently he was elected general of the Carmelite Order, in 1297.

See also 

 William of Littlington

Notes

1317 deaths
Carmelites
14th-century Italian Roman Catholic theologians
Scholastic philosophers
Year of birth unknown
Priors General of the Order of Carmelites